Sphoeroides greeleyi is a fish species described by Gilbert in 1900. Sphoeroides greeleyi is part of the genus Sphoeroides and the pufferfish family Tetraodontidae. No subspecies are listed in the Catalog of Life.

References 

Tetraodontidae
Fish described in 1900